Goodenough Island in the Solomon Sea, also known as Nidula Island, is the westernmost of the three large islands of the D'Entrecasteaux Islands in Milne Bay Province of Papua New Guinea. It lies to the east of mainland New Guinea and southwest of the Trobriand Islands. The small outlier Wagifa Island lies to the south-east of the island, and is included within Goodenough's administration.

Climate and vegetation
Like much of New Guinea, the climate is tropical with high temperatures and humidity throughout the year.  The northwest monsoon season lasts from December to March and brings sudden rain squalls.  From May to October southeasterly winds are cooler and more gentle.  Tropical cyclones are infrequent.  Rainfall varies between 1,520 mm and 2,540 mm per annum.  Serious droughts occur once or twice a decade.  Rushing streams with waterfalls drain water from the central mountain.  Rain forest cloaks the higher elevations with secondary forest, grassland and native gardens on the lower slopes and coastal plains.  Soils are acidic.

A rare edible citrus plant, Citrus wakonai (Citrus warburgiana; locally called "kakamadu", a name shared with other citrus species), grows on Goodenough Island.

History
The D'Entrecasteaux Islands have probably been inhabited for several thousand years, the people being related to mainland Papuans. The first sighting of the archipelago by a European was by the French mariner Joseph Antoine Bruni d'Entrecasteaux in 1792 but it remained unexplored by Europeans until 1874 when Captain John Moresby, commanding HMS Basilisk, landed on the westernmost island and gave it a European name after a British naval colleague, Commodore James Graham Goodenough.

The impact of western culture after Moresby's visit and before World War II was limited to missionaries, ethnographers and traders seeking whales, pearls or gold. In 1888 William MacGregor visited the island in his role as administrator of the newly proclaimed British New Guinea. In 1891 the Methodist Church of Australia established a mission station on Dobu Island (between Ferguson and Normanby Islands) under the direction of William Bromilow. From there mission stations were established in strategic centres in the D'Entrecasteaux and Trobriand Islands and the Louisiade Archipelago. In particular, in 1898 a mission station was established in Bwaidoga, Mud Bay, Goodenough Island. By that time traders had already created a regular demand for steel tools, cloth, and twist tobacco and the Dobu mission was recruiting natives to work in gold mines and copra plantations. These activities, and indeed the farming and hunting activities of the traditional people, were confined to localised areas on the fringing plains of the island. The mountainous hinterland remained entirely unknown and unpopulated above 1,100 m.

World War II
On 25 August 1942, a Japanese convoy of seven motorised landing craft (MLC) with 353 marines of 5th Sasebo Special Naval Landing Force stopped to rest at the south end of Goodenough Island. They were led by Commander Tsukioka and were bound for Taupota and participation in the Battle of Milne Bay. They became stranded when their MLCs were destroyed by No. 75 Squadron RAAF Kittyhawks.

On 22 October 1942 the Australian warships HMAS Stuart and HMAS Arunta disembarked 640 soldiers consisting of the Australian 2/12th Battalion, of the 18th Brigade from Milne Bay. They landed on both sides of the island's southern tip during the night. Intense fighting occurred during 23 October and during the night a successful rescue mission evacuated about 250 Japanese soldiers by submarine to Fergusson Island, where they were taken by cruiser to Rabaul. The remaining Japanese defenders were mopped up and the island declared secured by 27 October.

The occupation force remained on the island until 28 December 1942. During that time they used deception and camouflage to make the Japanese believe that a brigade sized force was occupying the island. They fabricated a 'ghost force' of dummy structures, including a hospital, anti-aircraft guns constructed of logs pointed at the sky, and barricades of jungle vines which looked like barbed wire. They also lit fires to appear as cooking fires for large numbers of soldiers, and sent messages consistent with what a brigade of soldiers would be expected to send.

During that time an American airfield engineer reported that a temporary airfield could be constructed for emergency use on the site of an existing mission airstrip on the northeastern plain near Vivigani. He also recommended that a permanent  airstrip be constructed.

The Fifth Air Force directed the RAAF's No. 9 Group to attack enemy bases in New Britain. To facilitate this, General Headquarters Operations Instructions No.31, dated 11 March 1943, set out that Goodenough Island, which was garrisoned by an Australian infantry battalion group with attached service groups and two Radar stations, was to be reinforced and prepared as an air force operating base with two landing strips, initially suitable for fighters, but with one being upgraded to handle heavy bombers. The fighter strip was available on 15 June. By the end of July, there were 3,614 RAAF personnel on the island. The bomber strip was completed on 20 October, although it is recorded that the first offensive use of the airfield was on 17 May by Beauforts of No. 100 Squadron RAAF.

As a part of Operation Cartwheel, Vivigani Airfield became an important staging point for Australian and American operations in the South West Pacific Area, an objective of which was to attack Rabaul in New Britain, the stronghold of Imperial Japanese forces.

RAAF Units active on Goodenough Island

RAAF logistics units active on Goodenough Island

Culture
The four languages of Goodenough (Bwaidoka, Iduna, Diodio, and Buduna or Wataluma) belong to the Milne Bay Family of Austronesian languages. The dominant language, Bwaidoka, was adopted as a lingua franca by the Wesleyan (Methodist) Mission at the turn of the century. At the 2000 census the population was 20,814.

List of villages working clockwise around Goodenough Island starting at Vivigani Airfield on the northeast coastal plain, as shown in Google Earth.
 Vivigani (this is not an actual village per se, although there are several in the vicinity of the airstrip)
 Bolubolu (the administrative centre)
 Mataita
Faiava
 Wailagi (United Church mission station and 1–6 Elementary School)
 Wagifa
 Kilia
 Lauwela
 Auwale
 Debenefue
 Diodio
 Tatala
 Waibula
 Ufaufa
 Wataluma Mission and Plantation
 Ulutuya Mission

Protected area
It provides a critical landscape function with a relatively high number of endemic, endangered and vulnerable species. The small black dorcopsis (Dorcopsis atrata), the only wallaby known to be endemic to a Pacific island, is endangered and needs careful management. Another species, the agile wallaby (Macropus agilis), was abundant but cannot be found today.

See also
Battle of Goodenough Island
List of volcanoes in Papua New Guinea
Goodenough Island Rural LLG

References

External links

Jenness M.A. and Rev. A. Ballantyne. (1920) The Northern D'Entrecasteaux, Oxford University Press.
Pacific Wrecks website
University of New South Wales News 

D'Entrecasteaux Islands
Islands of Milne Bay Province
Volcanoes of Papua New Guinea
Goodenough family